Mirja Lehtonen (October 19, 1942, Uurainen, Central Finland – August 25, 2009) was a cross-country skier from Finland who competed during the early 1960s.

She was born in Kyynämöinen.

She won two medals at the 1964 Winter Olympics in Innsbruck with a silver in the 5 km and a bronze in the 3 × 5 km relay.

Lehtonen also won a bronze medal in the 3 × 5 km relay at the 1962 FIS Nordic World Ski Championships in Zakopane.

Cross-country skiing results
All results are sourced from the International Ski Federation (FIS).

Olympic Games
 2 medals – (1 silver, 1 bronze)

World Championships
 1 medal – (1 bronze)

References

External links
 
 

1942 births
2009 deaths
People from Uurainen
Finnish female cross-country skiers
Cross-country skiers at the 1964 Winter Olympics
Olympic medalists in cross-country skiing
FIS Nordic World Ski Championships medalists in cross-country skiing
Medalists at the 1964 Winter Olympics
Olympic silver medalists for Finland
Olympic bronze medalists for Finland
Sportspeople from Central Finland
20th-century Finnish women